Chris Ramsey may refer to:

 Chris Ramsey (footballer) (born 1962), former footballer
 Chris Ramsey (comedian) (born 1986), English stand-up comedian and actor
 Chris Ramsey (adventurer) (born 1976), British adventurer and sustainable living advocate
 Chris Ramsey, a character from the ABC daytime soap opera Port Charles.

See also
 Chris Ramsay, Canadian magician and YouTuber